Koitaleel Arap Samoei (c.1860 - 19 October 1905) was an Orkoiyot who led the Nandi people from 1890 until his death in 1905. The Orkoiyot occupied a sacred and special role within the Nandi and Kipsigis people of Kenya. He held the dual roles of chief spiritual and military leader, and had the authority to make decisions regarding security matters  particularly the waging of war and negotiating for peace. 
Arap Samoei was the supreme chief of the Nandi people of Kenya. He led the Nandi resistance against British colonial rule.

Early life
Koitaleel Samoei was born to Kimnyole Arap Turukat at Samitui in Aldai. He was the  2nd last of five sons(siratei Arap simbolei was kipnyolei last born) and belonged to the Kaplelach age-set group of the Nandi.
he was reportedly close to his father and displayed the greatest ability in understanding prophetic signs.

Kimnyole, who is said to have predicted his death, reportedly summoned his five sons as he saw his time approach and asked them to consult traditional brews in a pot. Samoei, upon gazing into the pot, drew his sword in protest having perceived the coming of the Europeans.

Kimnyole sensed danger in his son's bravery and out of concern for his safety, sent Koitalel's three siblings to live among the Kipsigis while Samoei was asked to go and live among the Tugen people.

Ascension to Power
 
After the death of Kimnyole, a faction of Nandi people sent for Koitalel who had already taken refuge among the Keiyo people. Koitalel's brother, Kipchomber Arap Koilege, also laid claim to Nandi leadership, leading to a succession dispute. Factions formed around the two aspirants and minor skirmishes took place between their supporters but this did not extend to full scale war. The dispute ended with the defeat of Kipchomber Arap Koilege in 1895, after which he fled to the Kipsigis with his supporters, becoming the first Kipsigis Orgoiyot.

Koitalel was appointed successor to his father, and was made Orkoiyot in 1895.

When the British colonial government began building the Uganda Railway through the Nandi area, Koitalel led an eleven-year resistance movement against the railway.

Assassination

To end the resistance, intelligence officer Richard Meinertzhagen invited Koitalel to a peace truce meeting after leading a rebellion against the colonial invasion of the Nandi. The peace meeting was to be held at 11:00AM on Thursday, October 19, 1905. Suspecting that he would be killed as his father Kimnyole had foretold, Samoei instructed Meinertzhagen to come with five companions to meet him at Ketbarak (present-day Nandi Bears Club). Samoei was to come with five foretellers.

Contrary to the agreement, Meinertzhagen marched from the fort at Kaptumo with 80 armed men, 75 of whom hid near the venue of the meeting. It is reported that when Koitalel stretched his hand to shake hands with Meinertzhagen's, he killed Koitalel with a shot at point blank range. This precipitated the end of the Nandi Resistance.

Succession
He was succeeded by his brother, Kipeles Arap Kimnyole (aka Tamasun), while his son, Barsirian Arap Manyei (born 1894), would later become the Nandi leader from 1919 until 1922 when he was detained by the British colonial government. Barsirian was not released until 1964, making him the longest-serving political prisoner in Kenyan history.

Legacy
Koitalel has been immortalised as a national hero and a legendary leader among the Kalenjin community. A mausoleum has been built for Koitalel Arap Samoei in Nandi Hills, Kenya.
Construction of the Koitaleel Arap Samoei University by the national and local government in collaboration with the University of Nairobi is currently ongoing in Mosoriot and Nandi Hills, Kenya. The Koitaleel Samoei Secondary School situated in Nandi Hills town is named after him to commemorate his leadership.

See also 
List of rulers of the Nandi
Nandi Resistance
Koitaleel Samoei University College

References 

1905 deaths
Kenyan rebels
1860 births
People murdered in Kenya
Kenyan murder victims